The 2021 PCS season was the second year of the Pacific Championship Series (PCS), a professional esports league for the MOBA PC game League of Legends.

The spring regular season was scheduled to begin on 5 February but was delayed to 19 February due to regional COVID-19 restrictions. The spring split concluded with the spring finals on 18 April.

The summer split began with the first day of the summer regular season on 9 July and concluded with the summer finals on 29 August.

PSG Talon was the PCS' representative at the 2021 Mid-Season Invitational and first seed at the 2021 World Championship. Beyond Gaming was the PCS' second seed at the 2021 World Championship.

Spring

Promotion and relegation 
The organisers of the PCS announced on 4 August 2020 that a promotion tournament would be introduced for the 2021 season to promote regional competitiveness. Singaporean team Resurgence, which finished tenth in both splits of the 2020 season, had to play a relegation match against Impunity Esports from the Singaporean and Malaysian qualifier. Resurgence was relegated after a close series and Impunity Esports took their spot. Filipino team Liyab Esports, which finished ninth in both splits of the 2020 season, swept Panic Time from the Filipino qualifier in their relegation match and kept their spot.

Teams and rosters 
ahq eSports Club announced on 6 January 2021 that it would no longer participate in the PCS. Xue "Dinter" Hong-wei, who was previously the jungler for Taipei Assassins and Hong Kong Esports, acquired ahq's spot and created a new team named Beyond Gaming. Nova Esports also withdrew from the league and was replaced by BOOM Esports.

Regular season standings 
 Format: Double round robin, best-of-one

Playoffs 
 Format: Double elimination
 Winner qualifies for the 2021 Mid-Season Invitational

Ranking

Summer

Teams and rosters

Regular season standings 
 Format: Double round robin, best-of-one

Playoffs 
 Format: Double elimination
 Winner and runner-up qualify for the 2021 World Championship

Ranking

References 

League of Legends
2021 multiplayer online battle arena tournaments
Pacific Championship Series seasons
Pacific Championship Series season, 2021